Otter is a surname. Notable people with the surname include:

Jonas Otter or Jean Otter, (1707-1748), Swedish-born French diplomat, traveler, and writer
William Otter (1768-1840), first Principal of King's College London and Bishop of Chichester, England
William Bruère Otter (1805-1876), Anglican clergyman and Archdeacon of Lewes
Henry Charles Otter (1807-1876), Royal Navy Officer and hydrographic surveyor
Francis Otter (1831–1895), English Liberal Member of Parliament
Fredrik Wilhelm von Otter (1833–1910), Swedish naval officer and politician; Prime Minister of Sweden from 1900 to 1902
William Dillon Otter (1843-1929), soldier who was the first Canadian-born Chief of the General Staff of the Canadian Army
Anthony Otter (1896-1986), sixth Bishop of Grantham, England
Göran von Otter (1907–1988), Swedish diplomat
Butch Otter (born 1942), U.S. politician and former Governor of Idaho
Anne Sofie von Otter (born 1955), Swedish mezzo-soprano